Jewish Communism can refer to:
 Hebrew Communists, a short-lived political party in Mandate Palestine and Israel
 Jewish Bolshevism, a conspiracy theory that regards communism as a Jewish plot
 Jewish left, Jews with left-wing political views
 Żydokomuna, a Polish version of the Jewish Bolshevism conspiracy theory